The 1884 season was the first season of regional competitive association football in Australia. The Anglo-Queensland Football Association introduced the Anglo Queensland FA Cup in 1884 and the Anglo-Australian Football Association introduced the George and George Challenge Cup.

Cup competitions

(Note: figures in parentheses display the club's competition record as winners/runners-up.)

See also
 Soccer in Australia

References

1884 in Australian sport
Seasons in Australian soccer
Australian soccer by year
1884 in Australian soccer